Habu is a village in North-West District of Botswana. It is located in the central part of the district, close to the Okavango Delta, and has a primary school. The population was 304 in the 2001 census.

References

North-West District (Botswana)
Villages in Botswana